Sibbaldia cuneata, the cuneate cinquefoil or five finger cinquefoil, is a species of flowering plant in the family Rosaceae, native to Afghanistan, Pakistan, the Himalaya, China, and Taiwan. As its synonym Potentilla cuneata it has gained the Royal Horticultural Society's Award of Garden Merit.

References

Potentilleae
Flora of Afghanistan
Flora of Pakistan
Flora of West Himalaya
Flora of Nepal
Flora of East Himalaya
Flora of Tibet
Flora of Qinghai
Flora of South-Central China
Flora of Taiwan
Plants described in 1846